The Arockalypse is the third studio album by Finnish rock band Lordi. It includes the hit single "Hard Rock Hallelujah", which won the Eurovision Song Contest 2006 for Finland. The album has sold triple platinum in Finland and gold in Sweden. Although the album cover shows OX, it was Kalma who played bass guitar on the album.

Guests
The Arockalypse has many guest-stars on its tracks: Dee Snider and Jay Jay French from Twisted Sister, Udo Dirkschneider from Accept/U.D.O. and Bruce Kulick from Kiss. Before the album was released in Finland, there were rumours about other possible guest stars, including Sebastian Bach from Skid Row, Alice Cooper, King Diamond, Rob Zombie, and other members of Kiss, the latter being Lordi's greatest influence. In reality, only Sebastian Bach and Alice Cooper were ever asked to be guests on the album, but neither were able to make it.

Track listing
 "SCG3 Special Report" (with Starbuck as The News Reporter, Sam Romero and Dee Snider as "the monster squad's spokesman") – 3:46 (Mr Lordi/Kita)
 "Bringing Back the Balls to Rock" – 3:31 (Mr Lordi)
 "The Deadite Girls Gone Wild" – 3:45 (Mr Lordi/Kita/Tracy Lipp)
 "The Kids Who Wanna Play with the Dead" – 4:07 (Mr Lordi)
 "It Snows in Hell" (feat. Bruce Kulick) – 3:37 (Mr Lordi/Kita/Lipp)
 "Who's Your Daddy?" – 3:38 (Mr Lordi)
 "Hard Rock Hallelujah" – 4:07 (Mr Lordi)
 "They Only Come Out at Night" (feat. Udo Dirkschneider) – 3:49 (Mr Lordi/Amen)
 "The Chainsaw Buffet" (feat. Jay Jay French) – 3:57 (Mr Lordi)
 "Good to Be Bad" – 3:31 (Mr Lordi)
 "The Night of the Loving Dead" – 3:09 (Mr Lordi)
 "Supermonstars (The Anthem of the Phantoms)" – 4:04 (Mr Lordi)

Bonus tracks
 "Would You Love a Monsterman? (2006)"
 "Mr. Killjoy"
 "EviLove"

Charts and certifications

Charts

Certifications

Personnel 
Credits for The Arockalypse adapted from liner notes.

Lordi
 Mr Lordi – vocals, cover art, layout
 Amen – guitars
 Kita – drums, backing vocals, recording, mixing
 Kalma – bass
 Awa – keyboards

Additional musicians
 Michael Majalahti – voice
 Bruce Kulick – guitars (5)
 Tracy Lipp – voice (1)
 Alexandra Alexis – voice (1)
 Dee Snider – vocals (1)
 Udo Dirkschneider – vocals (8)
 Jay Jay French – guitars (9)
 The Fire Quire of Lathe St. – backing vocals
 Nottingburroughs Boy Choir – backing vocals (7)
 The Naughty Lordi Girls Choir – backing vocals

Production
 Svante Forsbäck – mastering
 Mika Lindberg – cover art, layout
 Petri Haggrén – photography
 Jyrki Tuovinen – production, recording, mixing

References

Arockalypse, The
Arockalypse, The
The End Records albums